Varsham is a 2004 Indian Telugu-language romantic action film produced by M.S. Raju on his Sumanth Art Productions banner and directed by Sobhan, the film stars Prabhas, Trisha, and Gopichand and the music was composed by Devi Sri Prasad.

The film was remade in Tamil as Mazhai, Odia as Barsa My Darling, and in Hindi as Baaghi.

Plot
Venkat, an unemployed youngster, meets Sailaja, a middle-class beauty, on a train journey, and they are immediately attracted to each other after dancing in a rain shower. At the same time, Sailaja catches the eye of Bhadranna, a dangerous, ruthless politician who also fell in love with her. Venkat keeps bumping into Sailaja every time it rains, and they fall in love. Ranga Rao, Sailaja's father, is a typical black sheep with many bad habits. Bhadranna approaches him with the marriage proposal, and Ranga Rao jumps on that and agrees. Later, a film producer Seenayya approaches Ranga Rao with an offer for Sailaja to act in a movie. Ranga Rao thinks that acting in films would be more lucrative than marrying her off to Bhadranna. He first successfully creates clashes between lovers, convinces Sailaja to act in a movie, and leaves with her to the city. Venkat also leaves for Vizag to his uncle's place. In Vizag, Sailaja becomes a leading lady in the movies, and Venkat works with his uncle in a quarry as a demolition expert. Months later, Bhadranna is cheated of some money by Ranga Rao, and he finds out where Sailaja now lives, kidnaps her, and tries to change her mind about marrying him. Seenayya gets tensed as the shooting was paused, and Ranga Rao advises him to approach Venkat, as he believes that Venkat still loves Sailaja. Venkat agrees and fights with Bhadranna for Sailaja. Gradually, Sailaja learns that she misunderstood Venkat and apologizes. They reconcile happily, and both start loving again. That night, Bhadranna kills his brother Kaasi for not bringing Sailaja. Bhadranna is coming back from Hyderabad to destroy Venkat and marry Sailaja. During the festival, Bhadranna stabs Venkat but is stopped by his uncle Sivayya. After the fight, Venkat defeats Bhadranna and embraces Sailaja and Venkat's friends. Suddenly, Bhadranna regains consciousness but dies when a statue covered in fire collapses on him. The movie ends with Venkat and Sailaja reuniting.

Cast

Soundtrack

Music was composed by Devi Sri Prasad and all lyrics were penned by Sirivennela Seetaaraama Saastry. Music was released on Aditya Music.

Reception 
A critic from Sify said that "The major drawback of Varsham is the second half, which has an overdose of violence and narration is marred by two dream songs. The director Shobhan loses grip on the story after the fast paced first half. Still Varsham is worth a look". Jeevi of Idlebrain.com opined that "It's a love story with good technical values. You may definitely watch this film".

Awards and nominations

Box office
The film celebrated a 50-day run in 125 centers The film celebrated its silver jubilee (175 days) celebration with Chiranjeevi attending as the chief guest.

Re-release 
 
This movie was re-released in 2022, November 11 with a 4K resolution. Sandhya 70mm and Sandhya 35mm theaters in RTC Cross Road, Hyderabad had two shows each (at 8.15 am and 9 pm), and the housefull run.

References

External links
 

2004 films
Films shot in Warangal
Telugu films remade in other languages
Indian romantic action films
2000s Telugu-language films
2000s romantic action films
Films about kidnapping in India
Films about landlords
Films directed by Sobhan